Mt Wellington Rugby Football Club is a rugby union club based in Auckland, New Zealand. At senior level, the club fields four teams - Premier, Reserves, U-21 and U-19 - through a joint venture with Te Papapa Onehunga.

External links
Club website
Auckland RFU club profile

Sport in Auckland
New Zealand rugby union teams